is a Japanese professional basketball player who plays for the San-en NeoPhoenix of the B.League in Japan.

Career statistics 

|-
| align="left" | 2011-12
| align="left" | Panasonic
| 41||41 || 33.7|| .422|| .383|| .852|| 3.4|| 0.7|| 0.5|| 0.3||  15.7
|-
| align="left" | 2012-13
| align="left" | Panasonic
| 30||29 || 32.8|| .456|| .461|| bgcolor="CFECEC"|.911*|| 2.4|| 0.9|| 0.5|| 0.4||15.6
|-
| align="left" | 2013-14
| align="left" | Aisin
| 52|| 50|| 31.9|| .465|| bgcolor="CFECEC"|.473*|| .868|| 2.3|| 0.9|| 0.5|| 0.2||  15.4
|-
|  align="left"  style="background-color:#afe6ba; border: 1px solid gray" | 2014-15†
| align="left" | Aisin
| 45||45 || 34.9|| .485||bgcolor="CFECEC"| .453*|| bgcolor="CFECEC"|.920*|| 2.7|| 1.0|| 0.8|| 0.0||  19.7
|-
| align="left" | 2015-16
| align="left" | Aisin
| 51 ||50 ||33.0 ||.422 ||.365 ||.850 ||2.4 ||1.1 ||0.5 || 0.1|| 17.5
|-
| align="left" | 2016-17
| align="left" | Mikawa
| 54 ||52 ||29.4 ||.450 ||bgcolor="CFECEC"|.426* ||bgcolor="CFECEC"|.908* ||2.0 ||0.7 ||0.5 || 0.1|| 16.7
|-
| align="left" | 2017-18
| align="left" | Mikawa
| 57 ||50 ||28.1 ||.445 ||.395 ||bgcolor="CFECEC"|.932* ||1.9 ||1.1 ||0.6 || 0.1|| 15.7
|-
|}

Personal life
He is a bass fishing enthusiast.

External links
 Stats

References

1989 births
Living people
Japanese men's basketball players
SeaHorses Mikawa players
People from Nakagawa, Fukuoka
Sportspeople from Fukuoka Prefecture
Wakayama Trians players
Asian Games bronze medalists for Japan
Asian Games medalists in basketball
Basketball players at the 2014 Asian Games
Medalists at the 2014 Asian Games
Forwards (basketball)
Basketball players at the 2020 Summer Olympics
Olympic basketball players of Japan